Robert "Robbie" Kerr (born 19 March 1967) is a former Australian rules footballer who played with North Melbourne and the Sydney Swans in the Australian Football League (AFL).

Kerr was recruited to North Melbourne from Corpus Christie. He made three appearances for North Melbourne in both the 1987 and 1988 seasons.

After playing for Brunswick in 1989, Kerr was picked up by Sydney in the 1990 Pre-Season Draft.

References

External links
 
 

1967 births
Australian rules footballers from Victoria (Australia)
Sydney Swans players
North Melbourne Football Club players
Brunswick Football Club players
Living people